The Eurasia Party (Partiya «Yevraziya») is a Russian political party. It was registered by the Ministry of Justice on 21 June 2002, approximately one year after the pan-Russian Eurasia Movement was established by Aleksandr Dugin. 

Often seen to be a form of National Bolshevism, one of the basic ideas that underpin Eurasian theories is that Moscow, Berlin and Paris form a natural geopolitical axis because a line or axis from Moscow to Berlin will pass through the vicinity of Paris if extended. Dugin and the party foresee an eternal world conflict between land and sea, between the United States and Russia. He believes: "In principle, Eurasia and our space, the heartland (Russia), remain the staging area of a new anti-bourgeois, anti-American revolution". According to Dugin's book The Basics of Geopolitics (1997): "The new Eurasian empire will be constructed on the fundamental principle of the common enemy: the rejection of Atlanticism, strategic control of the USA, and the refusal to allow liberal values to dominate us. This common civilisational impulse will be the basis of a political and strategic union". The party has been deemed neo-fascist by critics, a label Dugin denies.

The Eurasia Party was founded by Dugin shortly before George W. Bush's visit to Russia at the end of May 2002. The party hopes to play a key role in attempts to resolve the objective of setting the stage for Dugin's dream of a Russian strategic alliance with European and Middle Eastern states, primarily Iran.

Platform 
The Eurasia Party is based around the following five principles:
 It is a geopolitical party of the patriots of Russia and of the statists.
 It is a social conservative party, believing that the development of the market must serve the national interest. Interests of the state are in command and administrative resources must be nationalized.
 It is a traditionalist-communist party, founded on a system of Bolshevik values combined with traditional Eurasian confessions, namely Orthodox Christianity, Islam and Buddhism. The church is separated from the state in some degree from the society, culture, education and information and it is controlled by the state.
 It is a national party. In it the representatives of the national movements—first of all Russian, but also Tatar, Yakut, Tuva, Chechen, Kalmyk, Ingush and all the other ones—can find a way to express their political and cultural aspirations.
 It is a regional party. The rectification and salvation of Russia will come from the regions, where the people have saved their communist roots, the sentiment of the past and family values.

Foreign policy 
With respect to foreign policy, the Eurasia Party believes that:
 A path the West has taken is destructive. Its civilization is spiritually empty, false and monstrous. Behind economic prosperity is a total spiritual degradation.
 The exceptional character of Russia, its difference from both West and East, is a positive value. It must be saved, developed and taken care of.
 The United States exploited sorrow of the September 11 attacks in order to strengthen its positions in Central Asia. Under the cover of the War on Terror, it took roots in the Russian zone of influence and in the Commonwealth of Independent States. 
 From the cultural, social and political points of view, Europe is close to the United States, but its geopolitical, geostrategic and economic concerns are on the contrary close to Russia-Eurasia.

Domestic policy 
With respect to Russia's domestic policies, the Eurasia Party intends to:
 Reinforce the strategic unity of Russia, her geopolitical homogeneity, the vertical line of authority, curtail the influence of the oligarchic clans, support national business and fight separatism, extremism and localism.
 Promote Eurasist federalism by conferring the status of political subjects onto the ethno-cultural formations and by enforcing the principles of the rights of the peoples.
 Promote Eurasist economics by encouraging autarchy of the great spaces, economic nationalism and subordination of the market mechanisms to the concerns of the national economy.

See also 
 Eurasianism
 Foundations of Geopolitics
 National Bolshevism
 Civilization state
 Radical nationalism in Russia

References

External links 
 "Theses of Dugin's address to the Political Conference of the Pan-Russian Social-Political Movement Eurasia" (1 March 2002).

2002 establishments in Russia
Ruscism
Fascist parties in Russia
Eurasianism
Nationalist parties in Russia
Political parties established in 2002
Neo-fascist parties
Far-right political parties in Russia
Russian irredentism
National Bolshevik parties
Russian nationalist parties
Conservative parties in Russia
Political organizations based in Russia